Yaure (Yaouré, Yohowré, Youré) is a Mande language of Ivory Coast. Dialects are Klan, Yaan, Taan, Yoo, Bhoo.

References

Mande languages
Languages of Ivory Coast